Pors Stadion  is the home stadium of the second division football team Pors Grenland. Pors Stadion is located on the westside of Porsgrunnselva river in Porsgrunn, an area locally termed "Vessia". There is grass on three sides of the field, and on the other side there are stands covering about 1,000 spectators.

Record attendance was 8,000 people during a game against Skeid on September 5, 1954. The venue has hosted Norway national under-21 football team matches twice, playing 1–1 against Denmark on 4 June 1980 and 0–0 against South Korea on 4 November 1995.

External links
 Pors Stadion - Nordic Stadiums

References

Football venues in Norway
Eliteserien venues
Sport in Porsgrunn
Sports venues in Vestfold og Telemark
1936 establishments in Norway
Event venues established in 1936
Buildings and structures in Porsgrunn